Michael Del Zotto (born June 24, 1990) is a Canadian professional ice hockey defenceman for the San Diego Gulls of the American Hockey League (AHL) while under contract to the Anaheim Ducks of the National Hockey League (NHL). He was drafted in the first round, 20th overall, by the New York Rangers at the 2008 NHL Entry Draft. He has previously played in the NHL for the Rangers, Nashville Predators, Philadelphia Flyers, Vancouver Canucks, Anaheim Ducks, St. Louis Blues, Columbus Blue Jackets, and the Ottawa Senators. Del Zotto won the Stanley Cup with the Blues in 2019.

Playing career

Early career
Del Zotto played minor ice hockey with the Stouffville Clippers A of the Whitchurch-Stouffville Minor Hockey Association. He then played for the Richmond Hill Stars and the Markham Waxers in the Ontario Minor Hockey Association's Eastern AAA League. His Waxers team also featured Steven Stamkos, Cody Hodgson and Cameron Gaunce. The group won eight consecutive OMHA titles from 1999 to 2006 and the OHL Cup in Minor Midget. He played in the 2003 Quebec International Pee-Wee Hockey Tournament with Markham.

Del Zotto was the second overall selection by the Oshawa Generals in the 2006 Ontario Hockey League Priority Selection.

Junior
During his first season with the Oshawa Generals in the Ontario Hockey League (OHL), Del Zotto helped his home province of Ontario win the gold medal in the 2007 Canada Winter Games.

In his second season with Oshawa, Del Zotto's 63 points ranked him third among OHL defencemen. He made his second OHL playoff appearance in 2008, when the Generals reached the third round. Del Zotto was then chosen for the 2008 Canadian Hockey League (CHL) Top Prospects Game. At the end of the season, on June 20, Del Zotto was selected in the first round, 20th overall, of the 2008 NHL Entry Draft by the New York Rangers.

On January 8, 2009, Del Zotto traded along with teammates John Tavares and Daryl Borden to the London Knights in exchange for prospects Christian Thomas, Scott Valentine, Michael Zador and six draft picks.

Professional
After the 2008–09 OHL season concluded, Del Zotto signed a professional contract with the New York Rangers on May 26, 2009. On October 2, he made his NHL debut against the Pittsburgh Penguins. At age 19, he became the youngest defenceman in Rangers history to play on an opening night. Del Zotto scored his first NHL goal the next day, against Pascal Leclaire of the Ottawa Senators, in the Rangers' home opener at Madison Square Garden. Del Zotto proved he was an asset to the team, and, as a result, averaged 20 to 25 minutes per game throughout the 2009–10 season.

Del Zotto was awarded the NHL's Rookie of the Month award for October 2009 after posting 12 points in his first 14 professional games. Placing second in scoring amongst all rookie defencemen with 37 points in 80 games, Del Zotto was also named to the 2010 NHL All-Rookie Team.

In his second professional season, 2010–11, Del Zotto struggled to reproduce his rookie season form consistently, and was subsequently assigned to the Rangers' American Hockey League (AHL) affiliate, the Connecticut Whale, on January 4, 2011. However, he was later recalled by the Rangers, and finished the NHL season with 11 points in 47 games during his split year. During the 2011–12 season, Del Zotto rebounded in a highly-successful year for New York to complete his second full season in the NHL, scoring ten goals and 31 assists in 77 games.

As a restricted free agent during the 2012–13 NHL lock-out, Del Zotto signed a temporary contract with Rapperswil-Jona Lakers of the Swiss National League A on October 31, 2012. In nine games for the Lakers, Del Zotto produced two goals and seven points before returning to North America in anticipation for the shortened 2012–13 season. Upon a resolution to the NHL lock-out, Del Zotto signed a two-year contract extension with the Rangers on the opening day of training camp on January 13, 2013.

On January 22, 2014, Del Zotto was traded to the Nashville Predators in exchange for defenceman Kevin Klein. Del Zotto finished the season with the Predators with just one goal and five points from 25 games. With the final year of his contract completed, and despite being a restricted free agent, Del Zotto was not tendered a new contract offer by Nashville, and he subsequently became a free agent.

On August 5, 2014, Del Zotto signed a one-year, $1.3 million contract with the Philadelphia Flyers. Following the 2014–15 season, Del Zotto became a restricted free agent under the NHL Collective Bargaining Agreement. The  Flyers made him a qualifying offer to retain his NHL rights and, on July 5, 2015, Del Zotto filed for salary arbitration. The two sides came to an agreement on contract of two years, $7.75 million before the arbitration hearing.

On July 1, 2017, as an unrestricted free agent, Del Zotto signed a two-year contract with the Vancouver Canucks worth $6 million. In the 2017–18 season, Del Zotto played in a career-high 82 games and collected 6 goals and 16 assists for 22 points. He led the Canucks in ice time (1,706 minutes) and joined Henrik Sedin as the only two Vancouver players to play every game that season.

In the final year of his contract with the Canucks in the 2018–19 season, Del Zotto was unable to replicate his previous season form, producing just four points through 23 games. On January 16, 2019, Del Zotto was traded by the Canucks to the Anaheim Ducks in exchange for Luke Schenn and a seventh-round pick in the 2020 NHL Entry Draft. He made his debut with the Ducks in a 5–1 defeat to the St. Louis Blues on January 23, 2019. Del Zotto notched 600th NHL appearance in a 2-1 defeat to the Calgary Flames on February 22, 2019. He featured in 12 games with the Ducks, collecting 3 assists before he was moved on at the trade deadline by Anaheim to add depth to the St. Louis Blues in exchange for a sixth-round pick in 2020 on February 25, 2019. Del Zotto was a part of the extended Blues playoff roster, and watched from the press box as they won their first Stanley Cup in franchise history on June 12, 2019. His name appears on the Cup due to playing more than 41 games over the season (though only 7 with St Louis).

On July 16, 2019, Del Zotto returned to the Ducks, agreeing to a one-year, $750,000 contract.

Prior to the delayed 2020–21 season, Del Zotto was signed to a pro-tryout contract with the Columbus Blue Jackets on December 25, 2020. In the midst of the Blue Jackets training camp, Del Zotto impressed to secure a one-year, two-way contract on January 10, 2021. As a regular on the blueline with the Blue Jackets, Del Zotto featured in 53 out of 56 regular season games, collecting four goals and 13 points, however was unable to prevent Columbus from missing the playoffs.

On July 28, 2021, Del Zotto continued his journeyman career, and signed a two-year, $3 million contract with the Ottawa Senators.

On July 17, 2022, Del Zotto signed a contract with his ninth NHL team, joining the Florida Panthers on a one-year, two-way contract. On December 19, 2022, Del Zotto was traded by the Panthers to the Detroit Red Wings in exchange for Givani Smith. He was subsequently traded by the Red Wings to the Ducks in exchange for Danny O'Regan. Prior to being traded, he recorded two goals and eight assists in 25 games for the Charlotte Checkers during the 2022−23 season.

Personal life
Del Zotto attended St. Brother André Catholic High School in Markham, Ontario, and later attended St. Andrew's College in nearby Aurora. He wore number 4 in junior and in the NHL with the Rangers in homage to Boston Bruins great Bobby Orr.

Del Zotto's father, Steven Del Zotto, was a football player at York University and was drafted as a wide receiver by the Toronto Argonauts in the eighth round, 66th overall, of the 1986 CFL Draft.

Del Zotto has done charitable work, including Madison Square Garden's "Garden of Dreams" foundation, in which a segment of his work was featured in Lisa Varga's Beyond the Offseason.

In 2014, Del Zotto was derided by pornographic actress Lisa Ann on Twitter for harrying her regarding dating.

Career statistics

Regular season and playoffs

International

Awards and honors

References

External links

 

1990 births
Anaheim Ducks players
Belleville Senators players
Canadian ice hockey defencemen
Canadian people of Italian descent
Charlotte Checkers (2010–) players
Columbus Blue Jackets players
Connecticut Whale (AHL) players
Ice hockey people from Ontario
Living people
London Knights players
Nashville Predators players
National Hockey League first-round draft picks
New York Rangers draft picks
New York Rangers players
Oshawa Generals players
Ottawa Senators players
People from Whitchurch-Stouffville
Philadelphia Flyers players
St. Louis Blues players
San Diego Gulls (AHL) players
SC Rapperswil-Jona Lakers players
Stanley Cup champions
Vancouver Canucks players